Farmers' Organization Authority (FOA) is a Malaysian government statutory body under the Ministry of Agriculture and Agro-based Industries, Malaysia.

History
Farmers' Organization Authority was founded on 14 February 1973 through the gazetting of Lembaga Pertubuhan Peladang 1973 Act (Act 110). FOA was founded to carry the responsibility of helping to strengthen the social and economy of agricultural communities under a specific body with specific functions.

Act 109, Pertubuhan Peladang 1973 Act was specially formulated to restructure farmers' societies and agro-based cooperatives. Under the jurisdiction of this act, farmers' societies are abolished and were registered again as farmers' organisation (FO), while agro-based cooperatives will become units of FO. To date, there are 1531 agro-based cooperatives and 119 FO servicing rural agricultural communities.

Vision and Mission

Vision
Farmers’ Organization Authority (FOA) as a leading agency promoting the development of professionally managed farmers' organisations.

Mission
To develop Farmers’ Organization as an effective services provider towards the creation of commercial farmers.

Functions of FOA 
The functions of the FOA as laid down in the Act are as follows:-
 To boost, encourage and endeavour economic and social progress of farmers’ organisations
 To register, control and supervise Farmers’ Organisations and making provision for related matters. If a declaration was made through announcement under section 10, to design and implement any agricultural development in Farmers' Organization of those area and
 To control and co-ordinate the implementation of the activities

FOA implements all these activities that can be collated within three main functions as follow : 
 functions as Registrar
 functions as Management Agent and
 functions as Development Agent.

Registrar’s Function
Director General of FOA is Registrar of Farmers’ Organisation (FO) and agriculture-based cooperatives and is responsible for registering, supervising and controlling including auditing of account of all Area Farmers' Organization (AFO) and agriculture-based cooperatives. The power and tasks of the agency and registrar are related to :

 As Registrar of FO and agriculture-based cooperatives
 To supervise and control all activities of FO and agriculture-based cooperatives.
 To audit and control the account.
 To revoke registrations including abolishment of any organisation: and
 To give education and training to members

The Registrar has appointed the Chief Executives for related agencies as its representatives to facilitate operation and effectiveness of tasks and responsibilities of registrar in MADA, KADA and Sarawak. Director of state AFO were also appointed. However, the power to form, register, suspend, abolish and others are still under the jurisdiction of the Registrar.

Management Functions
FOA gives management service to FO to facilitate operations and implements projects efficiently. The services given include staff administration, management services, training of staff of FO and consultancy services.

Development Functions
The main thrust of FOA is to explore the economic and social development of FO and implements in an efficient and integrated manner to increase the income of FO to benefit members. Under the Ninth Malaysia Plan (2006–2010), the Federal Government has allocated RM291 million for specific economic and social development of FO.

Roles of FOA
FOA implements program and projects in line with current government policy in agriculture and rural development area including issues to reduce poverty gap and restructuring of society. The most relevant FOA's involvement in government policy are as follows:-

National Agricultural Development Policy (NAP)
FOA plays assisting role in implementing balanced development in the program and projects to eradicate poverty and restructuring of society under National Development Policy. FOA implements various activities related to policies in the Third Draft Plan Perspective (2001–2010). These policies are related to:

 Developing a resilient country
 Developing towards a just society,
 Maintaining economic growth,
 Being Competitive globally,
 Developing economy that is based on knowledge (K-Economy),
 Strengthening of Human Resource Development,
 Development that preserve environment

The Third National Agricultural Policy (NAP 3) 1998–2010
Under NAP 3, the direction, strategy and mechanism of new policy implementations were emphasised on agriculture and economy in total, concentration in food security, productivity, inflation, private sector investment in agriculture, export promotion and import reduction of imports that are not productive and conservation and usage of appropriate natural resources. Five FOA's main functions under FOA's Corporate Plan (2000–2005) and National Agriculture Policy are as follows:

 Stimulate and organise farmers to venture into agriculture projects that are based on climate and soil suitability, market demand and ability.
 Strengthening farmers’ institution in line with the Third National Agriculture Policy that aims to transform FO to become a business oriented organisation.
 Enhance entrepreneur farmers' development.
 Enhance human resource development.
 Equip FO with Information Technology facilities to enable them as the leading local agency in the rural sector.

National Farmers, Breeders and Fishermen Day 
The Sixth of August each year was gazetted as National Farmers, Breeders and Fishermen Day by the late Allahyarham Tun Abdul Razak. The celebration was first held on 6 August 1975 at the Parliament's compound with the theme of "Farmers' Unity – Farmers Are Important to the Country's Stability".

Events

External links
Official Web

Federal ministries, departments and agencies of Malaysia
Ministry of Agriculture and Food Industries (Malaysia)
Farmers' organizations
Agricultural cooperatives
1973 establishments in Malaysia
Government agencies established in 1973
Agricultural organisations based in Malaysia
Cooperatives in Malaysia